"" (Cyrillic: "", ; "Oh, Bright Dawn of May") is the national anthem of Montenegro adopted in 2004. Before its adoption, it was a popular folk song with many variations of its text. The oldest version dates back to the second half of the 19th century.

Lyrics
Although these are the official lyrics, many verses are repeated in order to follow the rhythmic composition.

History

Original version from the 19th century
The following is the oldest known version of the anthem, known as "Oh, Bright Dawn of Bravery, oh!"  (""). It was played in public for the first time in 1863 in the national theater in Belgrade. It was a component song of the "Battle of Grahovo or blood feud in Montenegro" heroic play in three parts. The play and the Montenegrin folk song was also played/sung in the National Theater again in 1870 and 1876.

World War II version
In 1944, Sekula Drljević, a Montenegrin fascist collaborator, rearranged the lyrics of the Montenegrin patriotic song "Oj, svijetla majska zoro" to celebrate the creation of the Montenegrin puppet regime that had been established in July 1941.

Popular song 
The song survived until today under various names as a popular Montenegrin folk song under the name "Oh, Bright Dawn of May" (""). This version of the song has been one of the several versions proposed in 1993 during the first discussion on the official state anthem, however, on which there was no consensus because of the disputed melodic value.

Controversies 
As the president of Montenegro, Filip Vujanović participated on several occasions public debates regarding the disputed parts of the national anthem, which was made official in 2004. On that occasion, the official text of the anthem also included two stanzas (third and fourth) sung by the Montenegrin fascist and war criminal Sekula Drljević. Controversy over the disputed parts of the anthem in the following years led to open divisions among the citizens of Montenegro, and Vujanović himself on various occasions publicly criticized the adoption of Drljevic's stanzas, from which he distanced himself, advocating changes to the official text of the anthem. Vujanović repeatedly pointed out that the adoption of Drljevic's verses was not acceptable because their creator was a fascist or Nazi, and on the same occasion he warned of the danger of strengthening extreme Montenegrin nationalism and chauvinism.

Historical anthems in official use
Ubavoj nam Crnoj Gori, national anthem of Principality (1870–1910) and later of Kingdom of Montenegro (1910–1918), with Nicholas I song Onamo, 'namo! as a popular anthem in the Montenegrin monarchy during the Nicholas I regime
Bože pravde, as the national anthem of the Kingdom of Yugoslavia (1919–1941), and Hey, Slavs as the national anthem of SFR Yugoslavia (1945/1977–1992) and later FR Yugoslavia / State Union of Serbia and Montenegro (1992–2006)

References

External links
 A midi version of the anthem exists at the official websites of
 the President of Montenegro
 the Government of Montenegro
 Himnuszok - A vocal version of the Anthem, featured in "Himnuszok" website.
 Oj, svijetla majska zoro - Audio of the Montenegro national anthem, with information and lyrics, from NationalAnthems.me (archive link)
 The Songs section of the Italian language website "NewMontenegro.eu" features two alternative versions of the anthem.
 nationalanthems.info - The sheet music and lyrics are featured in the "nationalanthems.info" site.

National anthems
European anthems
Anthems of Montenegro
National symbols of Montenegro
National anthem compositions in D minor
National anthem compositions in F major